Shannon Shorr (born June 7, 1985, in Birmingham, Alabama) is a professional poker player from Birmingham, Alabama.  Shorr was a baseball player at Shades Valley High School.

Shorr is notable for his success in poker tournaments, much of which occurred before his 21st birthday. Because 21 is the minimum legal age for gambling in almost all jurisdictions in the United States, Shorr was forced to go abroad to compete, where he cashed in several tournaments. He scored his first major payday with a fourth-place finish at the 2006 Aussie Millions tournament in Melbourne, Australia, where he won more than $200,000. During much of this time, Shorr was a civil engineering student at the University of Alabama.

Poker 

In December 2013, Shorr was honored at #7 on GPI's "Poker Player of the Decade" list.

Shorr has amassed multiple tournament cashes worldwide each year, including 70 World Series of Poker cashes, of which ten were final tables. He has made four World Poker Tour final tables.

Shorr withdrew from The University of Alabama to play poker professionally in 2006 but returned for the fall semester of 2008. He graduated in 2010.

In October 2019, Shannon Shorr won Borgata Poker Purple Chip Bounty Tournament. Shannon defeated Jeff Trudeau Heads-Up To Earn US$32,907 .

Shorr's live tournament winnings exceed $7,900,000. His 54 cashes at the WSOP account for $1,594,564 of those winnings.

During the 2015 WSOP Shorr cashed in a personal-best 10 events.

References

External links
Shannon Shorr official web site and blog
World Series of Poker: Shannon Shorr profile
CardPlayer.com Database: Shannon Shorr
Bluff Magazine: Shannon Shorr
PokerListings.com Profile
Interview with PokerListings.com
Pokulator: 10 Questions w/ Shannon Shorr

1985 births
Living people
American poker players
Sportspeople from Birmingham, Alabama
Sportspeople from Tuscaloosa, Alabama